Petelo "Pete" Noga (born June 24, 1964) is a former American football linebacker who played 3 games as a "replacement player" during the 1987 NFLPA strike for the St. Louis Cardinals of the National Football League.

He is brothers with Al Noga and Niko Noga, both former football players.

In popular culture
Pete and his brother Niko were briefly mentioned in an episode of Jon Bois' YouTube series, Pretty Good.

References

1964 births
Living people
Players of American football from American Samoa
Hawaii Rainbow Warriors football players
American football linebackers
St. Louis Cardinals (football) players
Players of American football from Honolulu
American sportspeople of Samoan descent
National Football League replacement players